Leucospilapteryx anaphalidis is a moth of the family Gracillariidae. It is known from Japan (the islands of Hokkaidō and Honshū) and the Russian Far East.

The wingspan is 6.0–7.1 mm.

The larvae feed on Anaphalis margaritacea. They mine the leaves of their host plant. The mine starts as a linear mine on the underside of the leaf, later it becomes a swollen blotch. The cocoon is made on a fold of the leaf and is elliptical, very elongate and brownish.

References

Acrocercopinae
Moths of Japan
Moths described in 1965